Vanad is a village in the province of Mashonaland West, Zimbabwe. It is located about 12 km north of Mutorashanga in the Mvurwi Range. The village started as a residential settlement for the Vanad chromite mine. According to the 1982 Population Census, the village had a population of 2,565.  In the 1980s it was established for the workers on a nearby mine, which collapsed a few years later after a large volume of water killed a huge number of workers.  The mine has since become a huge tourist attraction due to the waters which remain visible and is famously known as the Green Pool; it attracts at least 1,000 people every year from around Zimbabwe and the world.

Populated places in Mashonaland West Province